The Sarmiento line is a broad gauge commuter rail service in Buenos Aires Province, Argentina, run by the state-owned Trenes Argentinos since 11 September 2013.

History

This line had previously been run by the state-owned company Ferrocarriles Argentinos since nationalisation of the Argentine railways in 1948. FA operated the trains until 1991 when residual company FEMESA temporarily took over all the urban services prior to be privatized. After the Government of Carlos Menem privatized the urban railways services private company Trenes de Buenos Aires (TBA) took over Mitre Line.

TBA operated the line until the 2012 Once station rail disaster happened. As a result, the National Government revoked the concession granted to TBA and gave the Mitre and Sarmiento to UGOMS, that operated the line until 2014 when it was re-privatised and given under concession to "Corredores Ferroviarios S.A."

In 2014 the Government announced the acquisition of new trains to replace the existing Sarmiento Line rolling stock. The cars were manufactured by Chinese company CSR Corporation, with the first arriving in June 2014. The incorporation of the rolling stock was also accompanied by the replacement of rails between Once and Moreno.

During 2015 a series of improvement works were conducted and completed on the line. These included remodelling stations, new signaling and other infrastructure improvements such as replacing track and third rail segments, as well as the refurbishing of workshops. The works, which also included the installation of a communications-based train control system, meant that the line was closed on Sundays from February to June of that year on its electrified segment, with replacement bus services operating during that time.

Tunnels

The line has two underground segments not currently in use for passenger services. The first of these is an underground station within the Plaza Miserere Buenos Aires Underground station, which formerly provided a direct connection with Line A alongside its platforms, rather than passengers transferring from Once railway station to the line using underground passages. In May 2014, this connection was being restored with tracks replaced in order to restore the line's service to the Underground.

The second is a tunnel which runs directly from Once railway station to Puerto Madero in the centre of the city. Today this is only used for freight to the Port of Buenos Aires, however it was briefly used for passenger services in the 1990s. The tunnel is around 5 km long and runs through the middle of the city below Line A. Construction of the tunnel had been initiated by the Buenos Aires Western Railway in 1912, however it was not completed until 1916 due to delays caused by the First World War. The restoration of this tunnel is currently under way according to Trenes Argentinos Operaciones, however it is unclear if it will be used for passenger services or continued to be used for freight.

Historic operators 
Companies that have operated the Sarmiento Line since it was established after the 1948 nationalisation are:

Sarmiento tunnelling
The performance of the Sarmiento line was to be greatly improved by drilling a new tunnel. Under plans announced in 2006, a 33 km tunnel would be bored between Moreno and Caballito in order to replace the surface alignment of the Sarmiento commuter route. According to the Minister of the Interior and Transport, the first stage was to cost 11·5bn pesos, removing many level crossings which would "avoid many accidents and much loss of life". The new underground alignment would increase the service frequency to every 3 minutes, increasing capacity from 100 million to 280 million passenger-journeys a year. The tunnel segment would have 13 underground stations. Drilling took place for a few months in 2012, was suspended, resumed in 2016, and suspended again in July 2019 due to lack of funds; as of January 2020 the government is studying its options regarding contract cancellation.  During the construction, service on the surface line will continue.

Train services

Gallery

See also
Rail transport in Argentina
Sarmiento Railway
CSR EMU (Argentina)

Notes

References

External links

 
 Tren Sarmiento 

S
s
S